Assjack is the self-titled only album by American metal band Assjack. It was released on August 4, 2009. Lead singer Hank Williams III performed, wrote, and produced the album on his own from his home studio in Berry Hill, Tennessee.

Track listing
All music written and performed by Hank Williams III.

Personnel
 Hank Williams III - vocals, guitars, bass, drums, synth

Production
 Produced by Hank Williams III
 Engineered by Jim Lightman and Hank Williams III
 Mixed by Jim Lightman and Hank Williams III
 Mastered by Hank Williams III

References

2009 albums
Curb Records albums
Assjack albums